Puerto Rican rapper Residente has won 39 awards from 74 nominations. He has been nominated for five Grammy Awards and 42 Latin Grammy Awards, winning four and 27 awards, respectively. Both Residente and his step-brother Eduardo Cabra "Visitante" hold the record of the most Latin Grammy Award wins with 24 each.

He began his music career as member of Puerto Rican group Calle 13 in 2004. The band's first album Calle 13 (2005) garnered Latin Grammy Awards for Best Urban Music Album, Best New Artist, and Best Short Form Music Video (for "Atrévete-te-te". The album also received a nomination for a Billboard Latin Music Award for Reggaeton Album of the Year.

Their second album Residente o Visitante garnered them Latin Grammy Awards for Best Urban Music Album and Best Urban Song (for "Pa'l Norte"), and received nominations for Album of the Year and Best Short Form Music Video (for "Tango del Pecado"). The album also won a Grammy Award for Best Latin Urban Album.

Calle 13's third album Los de Atrás Vienen Conmigo (2009) was recipient of Latin Grammy Awards for Album of the Year, Best Urban Music Album, Record of the Year and Best Alternative Song (for "No Hay Nadie Como Tú"), and Best Short Form Music Video (for "La Perla"). The record also garnered their second Grammy Award for Best Latin Urban Album.

Their fourth studio album Entren Los Que Quieran received Latin Grammy Awards for Album of the Year, Best Urban Music Album, Record of the Year and Song of the Year (for "Latinoamérica"), Best Alternative Song and Best Short Form Music Video (for "Calma Pueblo"), Best Urban Song (for "Baile de los Pobres"), Best Tropical Song (for "Vamo' a Portarnos Mal"), and Producer of the Year. After winning nine awards at the 12th Latin Grammy Awards, Calle 13 broke the record for most Latin Grammy wins in history with 19 awards, as well as the most wins in a single ceremony. The album also received a nomination for a Grammy Award for Best Latin Pop, Rock or Urban Album.

The group's fifth and last album Multi Viral (2014) garnered Latin Grammy Awards for Best Urban Music Album, Best Alternative Song (for "El Aguante"), and Best Short Form Music Video (for "Ojos Color Sol"), and received nominations for Album of the Year, Record of the Year (for "Respira el Momento"), Song of the Year (for "Ojos Color Sol"), Best Urban Performance and Best Urban Song (for "Adentro"), and Best Short Form Music Video (for "Adentro" and "Así de Grandes Son Las ldeas"). The album also won a Grammy Award for Best Latin Rock, Urban or Alternative Album.

Residente's first album as soloist Residente (2017) garnered him Latin Grammy Awards for Best Urban Music Album and Best Urban Song (for "Somos Anormales"), and received nominations for Album of the Year, Record of the Year and Song of the Year (for "Guerra"), Best Urban Fusion/Performance (for "Dagombas en Tamale"), Best Alternative Song (for "Apocalíptico"), Best Tropical Song (for "Hijos del Cañaveral"), and Best Short Form Music Video (for "Desencuentro"). Residente also received a Grammy Award for Best Latin Rock, Urban or Alternative Album.

His social commitment, lyrics, and contribution to popular culture garnered Residente recognitions by Amnesty International, the Ateneo Puertorriqueño, the National University of La Plata, the Nobel Peace Laureates, and the Broadcast Music, Inc. (BMI).

Amnesty International

Amnesty International is a London-based non-governmental organization focused on human rights founded in 1961. Residente has received a special award for "his social commitment and identification with young people in Latin America."

!
|-
!scope="row"|2012
|Residente
|Emissary of Awareness
|
|
|}

Ateneo Puertorriqueño

The Ateneo Puertorriqueño (Puerto Rican Athenaeum) is a Puerto Rican cultural institution founded in 1876. Calle 13 received the Ramón Emeterio Betances Medal in 2011 for "having fought for the permanence of the Puerto Rican identity and the freedom of the island."

!
|-
!scope="row"|2011
|Calle 13
|Ramón Emeterio Betances Medal
|
|
|}

Billboard

Billboard Latin Music Awards

The Billboard Latin Music Awards are awarded annually by Billboard magazine in the United States since 1994. Calle 13 has received one award from five nominations.

!
|-
!scope="row"|2007
|Calle 13
|Reggaeton Album of the Year
|
|
|-
!scope="row"|2009
|"No Hay Nadie Como Tú"
|Hot Latin Song of the Year – Vocal Duet or Collaboration
|
|
|-
!scope="row"|2010
|Calle 13
|Latin Rhythm Albums Artist of the Year – Duo or Group
|
|
|-
!scope="row" rowspan="2"|2015
|Calle 13
|Latin Rhythm Albums Artist of the Year – Duo or Group
|
|rowspan="2"|
|-
|Multi Viral
|Latin Rhythm Album of the Year
|
|}

Broadcast Music, Inc. Latin Music Awards

Broadcast Music, Inc. (BMI) annually hosts award shows that honor the songwriters, composers and music publishers of the year's most-performed songs in the BMI catalog. Residente has received a special award in 2018 for his "musical career and philanthropic efforts."

!
|-
!scope="row"|2018
|Residente
|BMI Champion Award
|
|
|}

Cubadisco Awards
The Cubadisco Awards are presented annually by the Cuban Music Institute in Cuba since 1996 during the Feria Internacional Cubadisco (Cubadisco International Fair), an annual event dedicated to debates between music theorists, creators, and executives. Residente has received two awards as Calle 13.

!
|-
!scope="row"|2010
|Los de Atrás Vienen Conmigo
|rowspan="2"|Cubadisco International Award
|
|
|-
!scope="row"|2012
|Entren Los Que Quieran
|
|
|}

Grammy Awards
The Grammy Awards are awarded annually by the National Academy of Recording Arts and Sciences (NARAS) in the United States since 1959. Residente has received four awards from five nominations.

!
|-
!scope="row"|2008
|Residente o Visitante
|rowspan=2|Best Latin Urban Album
|
|
|-
!scope="row"|2010
|Los de Atrás Vienen Conmigo
|
|
|-
!scope="row"|2012
|Entren Los Que Quieran
|Best Latin Pop, Rock or Urban Album
|
|
|-
!scope="row"|2015
|Multi_Viral
|rowspan=2|Best Latin Rock, Urban or Alternative Album
|
|
|-
!scope="row"|2018
|Residente
|
|
|}

Latin Grammy Awards
The Latin Grammy Awards are awarded annually by the Latin Academy of Recording Arts & Sciences in the United States since 2000. Residente has received 27 awards from 43 nominations. He ties the record for the most Latin Grammy Award wins with his step-brother Eduardo Cabra "Visitante".

Lo Nuestro Awards

The Lo Nuestro Awards are awarded annually by television network Univision in the United States since 1989. Calle 13 has received four nominations.

!
|-
!scope="row"|2008
|"Pa'l Norte"
|Video of the Year
|
|
|-
!scope="row"|2009
|"Un Beso de Desayuno"
|Video of the Year
|
|
|-
!scope="row" rowspan="2"|2010
|"No Hay Nadie Como Tú"
|Collaboration of the Year
|
|rowspan="2"|
|-
|"La Perla"
|Video of the Year
|
|}

MTV Awards

MTV Video Music Awards
The MTV Video Music Awards are awarded annually by cable television network MTV in the United States since 1984. Residente has received one award.

!
|-
!scope="row"|2017
|"Immigrants (We Get the Job Done)"
|Best Fight Against the System
|
|
|}

Los Premios MTV Latinoamérica

The Premios MTV Latinoamérica were awarded annually by cable television network MTV Networks Latin America from 2002 to 2009. Calle 13 has received two awards from nine nominations.

!
|-
!scope="row" rowspan="3"|2006
|rowspan="2"|Calle 13
|Best Alternative Artist
|
|rowspan="3"|
|-
|Promising Artist
|
|-
|"Atrévete-te-te"
|Video of the Year
|
|-
!scope="row" rowspan="3"|2007
|rowspan="2"|Calle 13
|Best Urban Artist
|
|rowspan="3"|
|-
|MTV Tr3́s Viewer's Choice Award – Best Urban Artist
|
|-
|"Tango del Pecado"
|Video of the Year
|
|-
!scope="row" rowspan="3"|2009
|rowspan="2"|Calle 13
|Best Group or Duet
|
|rowspan="3"|
|-
|Best Urban Artist
|
|-
|"Electro Movimiento"
|Video of the Year
|
|}

National University of La Plata

The Rodolfo Walsh Award is presented annually by the School of Journalism and Social Communication at the National University of La Plata in Buenos Aires Province, Argentina since 1997. Calle 13 has received the Rodolfo Walsh Award in 2012 for their "contribution to communication and popular culture."

!
|-
!scope="row"|2012
|Calle 13
|Rodolfo Walsh Award
|
|
|}

Premios Juventud

The Premios Juventud are awarded annually by television network Univision in the United States since 2004. Calle 13 has received one nomination.

!
|-
!scope="row"|2014
|"Multi_Viral"
|Favorite Lyrics
|
|
|}

Telehit Awards

The Telehit Awards are presented annually by Mexican television network Telehit in Mexico since 2008. Calle 13 has received one award.

!
|-
!scope="row"|2012
|Calle 13
|Musical Quality
|
|
|}

World Summit of Nobel Peace Laureates

The World Summit of Nobel Peace Laureates is an annual event centered in peacemaking, serving as a forum for Nobel peace Laureates and representatives of the leading international organizations, media, business and government. Residente has received the Nobel Peace Summit Award in 2015 for "his song lyrics and his support for social causes."

!
|-
!scope="row"|2015
|Residente
|Nobel Peace Summit Award
|
|
|}

See also
Residente discography

Notes

References

Residente